This article is a discography for American singer Maria McKee. For releases as part of Lone Justice, see .

Albums

Studio albums

Live albums

Compilation albums

Singles

Miscellaneous music contributions, compilations, movie soundtracks, etc.
 "Never Be You" - Maria McKee - Streets of Fire movie soundtrack (1984)
 Sang uncredited background vocals on Tonio K’s "You Belong with Me" on the album Romeo Unchained (1986)
 "Bury Me" - Dwight Yoakam & Maria McKee (duet on Yoakam's debut album) Guitars, Cadillacs, Etc., Etc. (1986)
 Appeared in the music video of Somewhere Down the Crazy River by Robbie Robertson (1987)
 Sang backing vocals on American Roulette also by Robbie Robertson (1987)
 "Send Me the Pillow That You Dream On" - (harmony vocals) from Dwight Yoakam album Buenas Noches from a Lonely Room (1988)
 Sang backing vocals on the song "Nothing But a Child" - from the album Copperhead Road by Steve Earle (1988).
 "Show Me Heaven" - Maria McKee - Days of Thunder / movie soundtrack (1990) (No. 1 hit in the UK)
 Sang background vocals on the Album Mothers Heaven by Texas (band) vocalist Sharleen Spiteri (1991)
 Sang vocals and backing vocals on Falling Off the Edge of the World from Gavin Friday's album Adam 'n' Eve (1992)
 Sweet Relief: A Benefit for Victoria Williams (V/A compilation) (1993)
 Sang backing vocals on the song "Sullivan Street" - from the album August and Everything After by Counting Crows (1993)
 "If Love Is a Red Dress (Hang Me in Rags) - Maria McKee - Pulp Fiction (soundtrack) (1994)
 "No Big Bang" - Maria McKee w/ the Heads (of The Talking Heads) on their album No Talking, Just Head (1996)
 "Sweet Jane" - from the U2 bootleg Unforgettable Duets (1998)
 "Ma blonde est partie" & "Tout un beau soir en me promenant" - Maria McKee - Evangeline Made: A Tribute to Cajun Music (V/A compilation) (2002)
 "Soul Mass Transit" by Subterraneans (2006)
 "This Road Is Long" - Stuart A. Staples w/ Maria McKee (duet) - on Staples's album Leaving Songs (2006)
 Sang duet with Marvin Etzioni on the song "Temple & Shrine" from the album All Four One: Vol. 1 - Americana Compilation (V/A compilation) (2007)
 Sang backing vocals and played piano on the album I Can't Die In L.A. by Hail The Size (2009)
 After the Triumph of Your Birth, original film soundtrack by Maria McKee and Jim Akin (2012)
 "The Ocean of Helena Lee", original film soundtrack by Maria McKee and Jim Akin (2015)
 "Ol' Mother Earth" with Massar Egbari's "I Still Exist" - from the album Songs from a Stolen Spring (2014)
 Covered the traditional gospel blues song "Let Your Light Shine on Me" on the album God Don't Never Change: The Songs of Blind Willie Johnson (2016)

Maria McKee songs recorded by other artists
 "A Good Heart" recorded by Feargal Sharkey on his album Feargal Sharkey (1985)
 "A Good Heart" recorded by Kris McKay on the various artists soundtrack album "Road House" (1994)
 "To Miss Someone" recorded by Feargal Sharkey on his album Songs from the Mardi Gras (1991)
 "Am I the Only One (Who's Ever Felt This Way)" recorded by Dead Ringer Band on their album Living in the Circle (1997) and the Dixie Chicks on their album Wide Open Spaces (1998)
 "To Deserve You" and "The Last Time", recorded by Bette Midler on her album Bette of Roses (1995)
 "I Forgive You", recorded by Sam Brown on her album Box (1997) Song Co-written McKee/Brown
 "Show Me Heaven" recorded by Laura Branigan for her album The Best of Branigan (1995)
 "Show Me Heaven" recorded by Tina Arena on her album Don't Ask (1997)
 "Show Me Heaven" recorded by Jessica Andrews on her album Who I Am (2001)

References

Discographies of American artists
Rock music discographies